Nembrotha milleri is a species of sea slug, a dorid nudibranch, a marine gastropod mollusk in the family Polyceridae. This species was named after the nudibranch enthusiast Michael D. Miller.

Distribution
This species occurs in the tropical Indo-Pacific Ocean. There is another nudibranch species known only as Nembrotha sp. 14 in East Africa which may be a form of Nembrotha milleri.

Description
This animal can reach a total length of at least 60 mm. It has a grey-green to dark green body with blackish longitudinal wrinkles running down the length of the body. A different color form with pale yellowish green background has been observed around Taiwan.
The rhinophores and gills are typically black.

Ecology
Nembrotha milleri feeds on ascidians and tunicates. It has been seen feeding on the green-ringed ascidian, Sigillina signifera.

References

Polyceridae
Gastropods described in 1997